Sheffield is a city in Colbert County, Alabama, United States, and is included in the Florence-Shoals metropolitan area. As of the 2010 census, the population of the city was 9,039. Sheffield is the birthplace of "country-soul pioneer" and songwriter Arthur Alexander, French horn player Willie Ruff, notable attorney, actor, former senator and presidential contender Fred Thompson, Watergate committee U.S. Senator Howell Heflin and U.S. Senator Mitch McConnell, whose father was working in nearby Athens when he was born. It sometimes is referred to as "the City of Senators" due to the births of Heflin, McConnell and Thompson within its borders. Col. Harland Sanders worked in the Sheffield depot for Southern Railway in the 1907. It is also home to the Muscle Shoals Sound Studio where many popular 20th century musicians recorded their work, including Alexander and Ruff. It is the site of historic Helen Keller Hospital, formerly known as Colbert County Hospital and originally constructed in 1921. It was changed to Helen Keller Hospital in 1979, and Keller's birthplace Ivy Green is located less than one mile southwest of the hospital in adjacent Tuscumbia.

Geography
Sheffield is located in eastern Colbert County at  (34.759721, -87.694592), on the south bank of the Tennessee River. Sheffield is bordered to the south by the city of Tuscumbia, to the southeast by Muscle Shoals, and to the north, across the river, by Florence.

Sheffield was one of the Colbert County sites of embarkation by riverboat and barge on the Tennessee River during the forced relocation of Eastern and Southern United States Indian tribes, known as the Trail of Tears. The embarkation site was at what is now the Spring Creek boat launch and park area.

Sheffield is also home to the oldest bridge site in the state of Alabama.  What is today known as the "Old Railroad Bridge," is actually a bridge site that dates back to the early 1800s.

Economy
In 1940, Reynolds Metal Company set up its first aluminum smelting facility in Sheffield, paving the way for wartime expansion of aircraft production in the country.

Sheffield was the home of Muscle Shoals Sound Studios at 3614 Jackson Highway and later at 1000 Alabama Avenue.  Cher, The Rolling Stones, The Osmonds, Aretha Franklin, Bob Seger, Lynyrd Skynyrd, Simon & Garfunkel, The Staple Singers and many others recorded the biggest hits of their careers in this small studio, that remains well known and respected throughout the music industry.

Demographics

1990 census
As of the census of 1990, there were 10,380 people living in the city.  The racial makeup of the city was 70.9% White or European American, 27.61% Black or African American, 0.41% Native American, 0.33% Asian, 0.00% Pacific Islander, 0.5% from other races, and 0.9% from two or more races. 2.01% of the population were Hispanic or Latino of any race.

2000 census
At the 2000 census there were 9,652 people, 4,243 households, and 2,711 families living in the city. The racial makeup of the city was 71.21% White or European American, 26.21% Black or African American, 0.39% Native American, 0.28% Asian, 0.04% Pacific Islander, 0.57% from other races, and 1.30% from two or more races. 1.50% of the population were Hispanic or Latino of any race.
Of the 4,243 households 27.2% had children under the age of 18 living with them, 43.3% were married couples living together, 16.7% had a female householder with no husband present, and 36.1% were non-families. 32.5% of households were one person and 15.5% were one person aged 65 or older. The average household size was 2.27 and the average family size was 2.87.

The age distribution was 23.7% under the age of 18, 8.0% from 18 to 24, 26.6% from 25 to 44, 22.6% from 45 to 64, and 19.0% 65 or older. The median age was 39 years. For every 100 females, there were 85.5 males. For every 100 females age 18 and over, there were 80.6 males.

The median household income was $26,673 and the median family income  was $33,877. Males had a median income of $30,378 versus $18,033 for females. The per capita income for the city was $16,022. About 16.5% of families and 18.7% of the population were below the poverty line, including 27.5% of those under age 18 and 10.4% of those age 65 or over.

2010 census

At the 2010 census there were 9,039 people, 4,055 households, and 2,421 families living in the city. The racial makeup of the city was 69.7% White or European American, 26.8% Black or African American, 0.3% Native American, 0.3% Asian, 0.1% Pacific Islander, 1.1% from other races, and 1.7% from two or more races. 2.3% of the population were Hispanic or Latino of any race.
Of the 4,055 households 23.3% had children under the age of 18 living with them, 38.0% were married couples living together, 17.2% had a female householder with no husband present, and 40.3% were non-families. 36.1% of households were one person and 15.4% were one person aged 65 or older. The average household size was 2.23 and the average family size was 2.89.

The age distribution was 21.8% under the age of 18, 8.8% from 18 to 24, 24.9% from 25 to 44, 26.4% from 45 to 64, and 18.0% 65 or older. The median age was 40.4 years. For every 100 females, there were 87.3 males. For every 100 females age 18 and over, there were 91.3 males.

The median household income was $34,910 and the median family income  was $42,718. Males had a median income of $39,692 versus $25,464 for females. The per capita income for the city was $19,619. About 16.4% of families and 21.1% of the population were below the poverty line, including 36.3% of those under age 18 and 5.7% of those age 65 or over.

2020 census

As of the 2020 United States census, there were 9,403 people, 4,046 households, and 2,240 families residing in the city.

Notable people
 Arthur Alexander, country music songwriter and soul singer
 Gary Baker, songwriter and famous for "I Swear"
 Bo Carter, College Sports Information Directors of America Hall of Fame member
 Ben Cunningham, founder of the political advocacy group Tennessee Tax Revolt
 Douglas A. Foster,  historian and theologian
 Donna Godchaux, musician
 Wayne Greenhaw, writer and journalist
 Howell Heflin, United States Senator from Alabama
 David Hood, musician
 Rick James, former pitcher for the Chicago Cubs
 Jimmy Johnson, guitarist for the Muscle Shoals Rhythm Section
 John W. Keys, director of the United States Bureau of Reclamation from 2001 to 2006
 Adam Lazzara, lead singer for Taking Back Sunday
 Mitch McConnell, Senate Minority Leader (2021-), Senate Majority Leader (2015-2021), United States Senator from Kentucky  (1985-)
 Alfred Huger Moses, founder and first mayor
 Anthony Piccione, poet
 Willie Ruff, French horn and double bass player
 Roger Dale Stafford, serial killer
 Fred Thompson, actor and former U.S. senator from Tennessee
 William Willis, abstract art painter

References

External links
 City of Sheffield official website
 Colbert County official site
 Colbert County Tourism
 The Old Railroad Bridge (Historical Site)

Cities in Alabama
Cities in Colbert County, Alabama
Florence–Muscle Shoals metropolitan area
Alabama populated places on the Tennessee River